Koni Ngani is a village on the island of Anjouan in the Comoros. According to the 1991 census the village had a population of 2,045. The calculation for 2012 is 3,913 people.

References

Populated places in Anjouan